Robert Steven Rhine, also known by his pen name Corpsy, is an American writer and actor. He is the founder, publisher, and "Deaditor-in-Chief" of Girls and Corpses, a horror-comedy magazine.

Biography
He is the son of Larry Rhine.

Written work
Rhine has sold fiction to over one hundred magazines and the published anthologies.

He began working in comic books as a contributing writer for Cracked and Insidious Tales. Rhine's first solo comic book, Selected Reading From Satan's Powder Room (Asylum Press) quickly sold out and was followed up by a second helping titled CHICKEN SOUP FOR SATAN also distributed by Diamond. Alan Katz (producer of HBO's Tales From The Crypt) commented, "Gross putrid and downright offensive. Higher praise just doesn't exist!" A third comic book in the series, Satan Gone Wild, premiered in New Orleans on Halloween and also sold out. The success of these "humor-rific" comic books led to Rhine's 280-page, color graphic novel Satan's 3 Ring Circus of Hell (Asylum Press). 43 of the top comic book horror artists in the industry (including William Stout, Tim Vigil, Eric Pigors, John Cassaday, Hilary Barta, Alex Pardee, Alan M. Clark and D.W. Frydendall) contributed to the graphic novel, illustrating 43 twisted Rhine tales. Rhine has also written for National Lampoon magazine.

Film work
Rhine wrote, produced and starred in the filmed pilot, Vinnie & Angela's Beauty Salon and Funeral Parlor, Grand Prize winner (Gold Cineman) at the Australian International Film Festival and winner at Worldfest Houston. The film sold to Universal's Hypnotic Films. Rhine also wrote, produced, directed and starred in the epic/cult/satire Road Lawyers and Other Briefs, winner at the Chicago, New York, Houston, and Australian film fests (distributed by A.I.P.).

Rhine wrote and directed an animated television pilot Sickom, animated by Frank Forte. It was bought by Spike and Mike's Sick and Twisted Festival of Animation and premiered at the San Diego Comic-Con for an audience of over a thousand. The dark comedy series, about a serial killer's home life, was included on Spike & Mike's DVD Unprotected and toured animation festivals around the world.

Before becoming a full-time fiction, screenplay and comic book writer, R.S. Rhine worked for a decade as a unit publicist for Universal Studios, TriStar Pictures, DreamWorks and Imagine Entertainment on such features as: The Craft, MouseHunt, Hush, Tremors, Problem Child, Double Team and Toy Soldiers, amongst others. He has worked as an entertainment publicist, book publicist, film advertising copywriter, segment producer for PM Magazine and also worked for CNN.

Acting
Rhine has appeared in over a two dozen plays (including two L.A. premieres), television, features, print and commercials. Rhine also portrayed Rod Serling for director Joe Dante's "The Twilight Zone Tower of Terror" ride at Disney's Hollywood Studios. Coincidentally, Rhine met Rod Serling, who was an acquaintance of his family, several times when he was ten years old. In 2019 Rhine starred in Exorcism at 60,000 Feet, also serving as a scriptwriter and producer.

Reception, awards, and recognition
Rhine's first fiction collection, Me Brain Escape Me (Sun Dog Press) was heralded by Publishers Weekly as "a successful mix of humor and horror." Metro London was "fascinated with the blurred boundary between reality and the darkest recesses of imagination... doused in gallons of acid black humor." Writer William F. Nolan (author of Logan's Run and 60 books) called Rhine, "a bold new writer with powerhouse ideas and the talent to bring them to life."

In 2005, R.S. Rhine won first prize in the World Horror Con Dark Fiction Contest for his story "Propeller Boy." Rhine also received the Herman M. Swafford Fiction Award for his story "Andros" in 1997. Rhine's book "Satan's 3-Ring Circus of Hell" took top honors at the 2007 DIY Book Awards. 

The Huffington Post voted Rhine's magazine Girls and Corpses: The "Most ridiculous magazine" of all time.

Notes and references

External links
Official Site

American male actors
Living people
American magazine editors
American comics writers
American male non-fiction writers
Year of birth missing (living people)